The following is the complete list of the mayors of the city of Rochester, New York.

The powers of the mayor have varied over the years. When the city was incorporated in 1834, the mayor was appointed by the city council and had few responsibilities beyond presiding over council meetings. In 1840, the New York state legislature passed a law making the mayors of all incorporated cities elective. Various amendments to the city charter during the 19th century gave the mayor additional powers of appointment. In 1898, the state legislature adopted a uniform charter for all cities, establishing a mayor-council government where the mayor controlled all executive functions and appointments. In 1925, Rochester modified its charter in a referendum to switch to a council-manager government, where the mayor was ceremonial and executive functions were handled by a city manager appointed by the council. A second referendum in 1984 changed the city government back to a mayor-council government.

List of Mayors of Rochester

References
World Statesmen.org Mayors of U.S. Cities M – W
Political Graveyard
History of Rochester and Monroe County, New York

External links
 Rochester Wiki Mayors Page

Rochester